The Boone House is a historic house located at 4014 Lookout in Little Rock, Arkansas.

Description and history 
It is a -story masonry structure, built out of a combination of fieldstone, brick, and stucco. It is built in a rusticated Tudor Revival style, and was built in 1927 to a design by Thompson & Harding. It has a wide variety of textures to its exterior, and uses earth tones to blend into its relatively rural and wooded landscape.

The house was listed on the National Register of Historic Places on December 22, 1982.

See also
National Register of Historic Places listings in Little Rock, Arkansas

References

Houses on the National Register of Historic Places in Arkansas
Tudor Revival architecture in Arkansas
Houses completed in 1927
Houses in Little Rock, Arkansas
National Register of Historic Places in Little Rock, Arkansas
Historic district contributing properties in Arkansas